Kristian Gestrin (1929–1990) was a Finnish judge and politician who served in several cabinet posts in the 1970s. He was a long-term member of the Finnish Parliament. He also headed the Swedish People's Party of Finland in the period 1973–1974.

Biography
Gestrin was born in Helsinki on 10 April 1929. He was a judge by profession. He was a member of the Finnish Parliament from 20 February 1962 to 23 March 1979. The cabinet posts of Gestrin included: minister of defense in the second cabinet of Ahti Karjalainen between 15 July 1970 and 28 October 1971 and in the cabinet led by Kalevi Sorsa between 4 September 1972 and 30 September 1974; minister for trade and industry in the same cabinet between 1 October 1974 and 12 June 1975; minister of justice in the second and third cabinet of Martti Miettunen between 30 November 1975 and 14 May 1977; minister of education in the second cabinet of Kalevi Sorsa from 15 May 1977 to 1 March 1978.  

He headed the Swedish People's Party of Finland for one year between 1973 and 1974. Then he served as the governor of Helsinki Savings Bank.

Gestrin died on 7 April 1990.

References

External links

20th-century Finnish judges
1929 births
1990 deaths
Members of the Parliament of Finland (1962–66)
Members of the Parliament of Finland (1966–70)
Members of the Parliament of Finland (1970–72)
Members of the Parliament of Finland (1972–75)
Members of the Parliament of Finland (1975–79)
Ministers of Justice of Finland
Swedish People's Party of Finland politicians
Swedish-speaking Finns
Politicians from Helsinki
Ministers of Defence of Finland
Ministers of Education of Finland
Ministers of the Interior of Finland
Ministers of Trade and Industry of Finland